The Donric Group is an Australian owner of bus and coach companies in Victoria and Queensland. The group comprises 5 companies with over 250 vehicles and 300 staff.

History
The Donric Group was formed in March 1980 when Don McKenzie and Richard Baird purchased eight school buses from WJ Treweek to form the Sunbury Bus Service.  

In 1989 Coach Tours of Australia was established as a coach charter company. In March 1989 Sweet's, Bacchus Marsh was purchased and renamed Bacchus Marsh Coaches.

In 1994 Swanlink Coachlines, Swan Hill was acquired with two V/Line contracts.  It was sold in November 2007 to the Pickering Group, owners of BusBiz.

In 2000 Thege Coach Charter, Ballarat was purchased and renamed Gold Bus Ballarat. In 2001 Begonia City Coaches, Ballarat was acquired and incorporated into Gold Bus Ballarat. In October 2007 Organ's Bus Service, Kyneton was purchased.

In June 2010, Trans North Bus & Coach in North Queensland was purchased. In July 2010, Coopers Bus Service of Mirani and G&JE O'Neill of Finch Hatten were purchased, followed in October 2010 by Hasties Bus Service of Innisfail, and in January 2011 Henderson's of Ayr. All have been brought under the Trans North Bus & Coach brand.

In September 2019, Bacchus Marsh Coaches and Gold Bus Ballarat were sold to Christians Bus Co.  Don McKenzie sold his interests in the remaining Donric Group businesses to Richard Baird, who took 100% ownership of the Donric Group.

Companies
Companies which have been acquired by the Donric Group include:
Sweet's, Bacchus Marsh
Begonia City Coaches, Ballarat
Thege Coach Charter, Ballarat
Organ's Bus Service, Kyneton
Sovereign City Coaches, Ballarat
Tantau, Ballarat
Jones, Ballarat
Trans North Bus & Coach, Ingham
Cooper's Bus Service, Mirani
O'Neill, Finch Hatten
Hasties Bus Service, Innisfail
Hendo's Bus Service, Ayr

Companies currently operated by the Donric Group include:
Sunbury Coaches
Coach Tours of Australia
Organ's Coaches
Trans North Bus & Coach
Bowen Transit

Depots
Sunbury Bus Service: Romsey, Sunbury, Riddells Creek, Gisborne
Organ's Bus Service, Gisborne, Kyneton, Romsey
Trans North Bus & Coach: Atherton, Ayr, Bowen, Cairns, Ingham, Innisfail, Mirani, Mission Beach, Ravenshoe

Fleet
As at March 2020 the Donric Group operated 267 buses and coaches.

See also
Buses in Melbourne
List of Victorian Bus Companies
List of Queensland Bus Companies
List of Melbourne bus routes

References

Bus companies of Queensland
Bus companies of Victoria (Australia)
Australian companies established in 1980
Transport companies established in 1980